Doug Allen is a British actor. He has appeared in a variety of British television programmes and in film, but remains best known for playing the role of Nathan Williams in the BBC soap opera EastEnders between 2001 and 2002 and the role of Alton More in the miniseries Band of Brothers.

Filmography

Film

Television

References

External links

English male soap opera actors
Living people
Year of birth missing (living people)